Central Taiwan University of Science and Technology (CTUST) is a private university in Beitun District, Taichung, Taiwan.

CGUST offers undergraduate and graduate degree programs in a variety of fields, including engineering, business, design, and healthcare. Its engineering programs are particularly highly regarded, with specialties in mechanical engineering, electrical engineering, computer science, and information engineering. The university also has a number of programs in healthcare-related fields, including nursing, medical laboratory science, and healthcare management.

History
CTUST was originally established as Chungtai Junior College in 1966. On 1 July 1998, the college was upgraded to Medical Technology College. On 1 August 2005, the college was upgraded to Central Taiwan University of Science and Technology.

Faculties
 College of Health Sciences
 College of Nursing
 College of Management
 Overseas Youth Vocational Training School

Transportation
The university is accessible West from Taiyuan Station of the Taiwan Railways.

Notable alumni 

 Kate Liao, Chinese lyricist and production coordinator in the Chinese music industry.

See also
 List of universities in Taiwan

References

External links
 

1966 establishments in Taiwan
Educational institutions established in 1966
Private universities and colleges in Taiwan
Universities and colleges in Taichung
Universities and colleges in Taiwan
Technical universities and colleges in Taiwan